Tatarinskaya is a rural locality (a village) in Shelotskoye Rural Settlement, Verkhovazhsky District, Vologda Oblast, Russia. The population was 10 as of 2002.

Geography 
Tatarinskaya is located 61 km southwest of Verkhovazhye (the district's administrative centre) by road. Yakuninskaya is the nearest rural locality.

References 

Rural localities in Verkhovazhsky District